The Electoral district of Murray Valley was an electoral district of the Victorian Legislative Assembly.

It contained the towns of Cobram, Numurkah, Rutherglen, Wangaratta and Yarrawonga, as well as many other smaller towns.

The electorate was created in 1945 and abolished in 2014. For the entirety of existence it was held by the National Party and its predecessors.

Members for Murray Valley

Election results

External links
 Electoral Profile: Electoral district of Murray Valley, Victorian Electoral Commission

Former electoral districts of Victoria (Australia)
1945 establishments in Australia
2014 disestablishments in Australia